Blue chips are athletes, particularly high school players, targeted for drafting or signing by teams at the college level.  Collegiate players being scouted by professional franchises may also be referred to as blue chips.

Blue chip players are those who have proven themselves to be among the best at their positions in their respective sports and are more sought after and wanted than other players. They are typically perceived as "can't miss" prospects who are desired by most organizations. Blue chip athletes are likely to have an immediate impact on teams that acquire them and have proven skills rather than speculative or untapped potential. Many top recruits eventually go on to be successful at the professional level, especially in basketball and baseball.

See also
Recruiting (college athletics)
Draft bust

References

Sports terminology